Neven Marković (Serbian Cyrillic: Невен Марковић; born 20 February 1987) is a Serbian retired footballer.

Club career
Born in Čapljina, SR Bosnia and Herzegovina, SFR Yugoslavia, Marković grew up in Belgrade and he formerly played for FK Rad and FK Mladost Lučani in the Serbian SuperLiga. He was bought by FC Vaslui at the beginning of the 2008-09 season for €250,000. At first Vaslui, bought him as a substitute, but in the first half of the season, due to injuries, he began to see more regular action.

On 6 July 2012, Marković signed a contract with Sporting Kansas City of Major League Soccer.

Marković was released by Kansas City on November 19, 2012.

Marković last played for Lechia Gdańsk from Poland.

Honors
Vaslui
UEFA Intertoto Cup: 2008
Sporting Kansas City
Lamar Hunt U.S. Open Cup: 2012

References

External links
 
 Sporting KC profile
 SrbijaFudal profile and stats
 

1987 births
Living people
People from Čapljina
Serbs of Bosnia and Herzegovina
Association football fullbacks
Bosnia and Herzegovina footballers
FK Rad players
FK Mladost Lučani players
FC Vaslui players
A.O. Kerkyra players
NK Zagreb players
Doxa Drama F.C. players
Sporting Kansas City players
Servette FC players
Lechia Gdańsk players
Serbian SuperLiga players
Liga I players
Super League Greece players
Croatian Football League players
Major League Soccer players
Swiss Challenge League players
Ekstraklasa players
Bosnia and Herzegovina expatriate footballers
Expatriate footballers in Romania
Bosnia and Herzegovina expatriate sportspeople in Romania
Expatriate footballers in Croatia
Expatriate soccer players in the United States
Expatriate footballers in Poland